Arcisses is a commune in the Eure-et-Loir department in northern France. It was established on 1 January 2019 by merger of the former communes of Margon (the seat), Brunelles and Coudreceau.

Population

See also
Communes of the Eure-et-Loir department

References

Communes of Eure-et-Loir
Populated places established in 2019
2019 establishments in France